The individual eventing at the 1968 Summer Olympics took place between 18 and 21 October. The event was open to men and women. The competition included three segments: dressage, cross-country, and show-jumping. Penalties from each were summed to give a total score.

Results

49 riders competed.

Standings after dressage

Standings after cross-country

Final standings after jumping

References

Equestrian at the 1968 Summer Olympics